Defending champions Gigi Fernández and Natasha Zvereva defeated Jana Novotná and Arantxa Sánchez Vicario in the final, 6–3, 6–7(4–7), 6–3 to win the doubles tennis title at the 1994 Virginia Slims Championships.

Seeds

Draw

Draw

References 

Championships - Doubles, 1994 Wta Tour
Doubles